The Kunming-Montreal Global Biodiversity Framework (GBF) is an outcome of the 2022 United Nations Biodiversity Conference. Its tentative title had been the "Post-2020 Global Biodiversity Framework". The GBF was adopted by the 15th Conference of Parties (COP15) to the Convention on Biological Diversity on 19 December, 2022. It has been promoted as a "Paris Agreement for Nature".

The Framework is named after two cities, Kunming, which was scheduled to be the host city for COP15 in October 2020 but postponed and subsequently relinquished the hosting duties due to China's COVID policy, and Montreal, which is the seat of the Convention on Biological Diversity Secretariat and stepped in to host COP15 after Kunming's cancellation.

The GBF contains 4 global goals ("Kunming-Montreal Global Goals for 2050") and 23 targets ("Kunming-Montreal 2030 Global Targets"). "Target 3" is especially referred to as the "30 by 30" target. It succeeds the Strategic Plan for Biodiversity 2011-2020 (including the Aichi Biodiversity Targets).

See also
 Paris Agreement

References

External links
 The 15th Conference of Parties (COP15) to the Convention on Biological Diversity (CBD) official documents

2022 documents
2022 in the environment
Convention on Biological Diversity
Environmental policy